"Last Night a D.J. Saved My Life" is a song written by Michael Cleveland, sung by American group Indeep, and released as a single in 1982 by Sound of New York and Becket Records. It features vocals from Réjane "Reggie" Magloire and Rose Marie Ramsey. The track appears as the third track of the namesake album released in 1983.

Music and lyrics
The lyrics tell the story of a woman who is bored alone at home. She wants to speak to her man, but cannot reach him and considers leaving him, until a DJ plays a hot song and thereby saves her from a broken heart. In the second verse, she leaves home, but does not reach her destination. 

The song was mixed by Michael Jay at Eastern Artists Recording Studio, East Orange, New Jersey.

Chart performance
In the US, "Last Night a D.J. Saved My Life" reached number ten on the Billboard R&B/Hip-Hop Singles chart and number two on the Billboard Club Singles chart, but could only bubble under the main Billboard Hot 100, where black crossover had become very difficult in the early 1980s as a result of the anti-disco backlash. In February 1983, it peaked at number thirteen in the United Kingdom, and in March 1983 in the Netherlands on national radiostation Hilversum 3 at number two in the Dutch Top 40, Nationale Hitparade and the TROS Top 50. In the European chart on Hilversum 3, the TROS Europarade it reached number 9.

In Belgium (Flanders) Ultratop 50 it reached number 2 and even number 1 in the Radio 2 Top 30. It also made number 5 in Switzerland, number 12 in Austria and number 25 in New Zealand.  In West Germany, it made it to number 10.

Because of the limited success of Indeep's later releases, the group's first single was its only major hit and placed it into the one-hit wonder category of artists.

Reception
Rolling Stone magazine declared the song "one of the greatest songs ever written about being a girl, listening to the radio, or any combination of the two," and, in 2005, editors of Blender magazine placed it at number 406 on its 500 Greatest Songs Since You Were Born list. The song also provided the inspiration of the title of the book Last Night a DJ Saved My Life: The History of the Disc Jockey (2000). In 2022, Rolling Stone ranked it number five in their list of 200 Greatest Dance Songs of All Time.

Charts

Weekly charts

Year-end charts

Certifications

Covers
 In 1983, South African vocalist Margino recorded a version for her album of the same name.
 In 1997, King Britt included a version of this song on his album King Britt Presents Sylk 130 – When The Funk Hits The Fan.
 In 2001, American R&B singer Mariah Carey co-produced a cover of "Last Night a DJ Saved My Life" with DJ Clue and Duro, which appeared on her eighth album, Glitter. Carey's version of the song features Fabolous and Busta Rhymes, and it is heard during a scene in the film Glitter, in which Carey starred. It was released as the album's sixth and final single in 2001 in Spain on a strictly promotional basis to boost the album's slow sales, as the preceding singles from the album had performed poorly. Because of its limited release and conflict between Carey and Virgin/EMI Records, the single's music video (directed by Sanaa Hamri) was not released until late 2002–early 2003 through Carey's online fan club.
 In 2003, Fab For with Robert Owens released a version with somewhat changed lyrics under the title "Last Night a DJ Blew My Mind", reaching number 34 on the UK Singles Chart and number six on the UK Dance Chart.
 In 2004, UK house/trance music producer Seamus Haji made several popular remixes of the song through his own label, Big Love Records, and released them on a 12" single titled "Last Night a DJ Saved My Life (ATFC Mixes)". This version reached number thirteen on the UK Singles Chart and number one on the UK Dance Chart in 2006.
 In 2006, Slovak recording artist Dara Rolins covered the song under the title "Party DJ".
 In 2013, Milk Inc. released a vocal trance version.

Samplings
 The song is sampled during Madonna's performance of her song "Music" on her Sticky & Sweet Tour.
 The song "If Ya Gettin' Down" by Five features a sample of the song, alongside a take on the in the mix lyrics during the bridge.
 The song "Black Betty" as covered by Tom Jones uses or samples the drum, bass, and guitar groove of this song.
 The 1988 worldwide hit "Bring Me Edelweiss" by Austrian band Edelweiss, borrowed large parts of its melody from both this song and ABBA's "SOS".
 The chorus of the song is sampled, as well as translated, in Quebecois singer and songwriter Jean Leloup's song "1990". The song ends with backup singers repeatedly chanting "hier soir le D.J. a sauvé mon âme avec cette chanson" ("last night the D.J. saved my soul with this song").
 The song was sampled in the 2015 song "Hell of a Night" by Chris Brown contained in his mixtape Before the Party.
 The beat of the song was sampled in song "Nlogax" by Boards of Canada.
 The song is sampled in the 2009 single "I'm Just Here for the Music" by Paula Abdul.

Other uses
 The song was remixed by DJ Kambel and MC Magika in 2002, appearing on Dancemania Speed 8 with the name "Last Nite Kambel Saved My Life".
 The song is featured in the 2002 video game Grand Theft Auto: Vice City on "Fever 105", one of the in-game radio stations accessed while driving.
 The song appears in the 2006 feature film Cashback.
 Italian band Mirage performed a remix of this song on the 2007 compilation After Dark, released by the Italians Do It Better record label.
 The song "Wrong Club" by The Ting Tings features an homage in the lyric "No DJ never saved my life".
 The song appears in the first episode of The Assassination of Gianni Versace: American Crime Story.
 The song appears in several mixes in the video game DJ Hero.
 In episode 3 of the Amazon Prime travelogue show James May: Our Man in Japan, a brief clip of James May singing this song in a karaoke room in Tokyo is shown "due to complex international music licensing laws".

References

1982 debut singles
Mariah Carey songs
Post-disco songs
1982 songs
Number-one singles in Zimbabwe